The Ligures or Ligurians were an ancient people after whom Liguria, a region of present-day north-western Italy, is named.
	
In pre-Roman times, the Ligurians occupied the present-day Italian region of Liguria, Piedmont, northern Tuscany, western Lombardy, western Emilia-Romagna and northern Sardinia, but are believed to have once occupied an even larger portion of ancient Italy as far south as Sicily. They inhabited also the French region of Provence-Alpes-Côte d'Azur and Corsica. However, it is generally believed that around 2000 BC, the Ligurians occupied a much larger area, extenting as far as what today is Catalonia (in the north-eastern corner of the Iberian Peninsula). 

The origins of the ancient Ligurians are unclear, and an autochthonous origin is increasingly probable. Little is known about the ancient Ligurian language, which is based on placenames and inscriptions on steles representing warriors. The lack of evidence does not allow a certain linguistic classification; it may be Pre-Indo-European or an Indo-European language. 

Because of the strong Celtic influences on their language and culture, they were also known in antiquity as Celto-Ligurians.

Name 
The Ligures are referred to as Ligyes (λιγούρες) by the Greeks and Ligures (earlier Liguses) by the Romans. According to Plutarch, the Ligurians called themselves Ambrones, which could indicate a relationship with the Ambrones of northern Europe.

Geographical area of ancient Liguria 

The geography of Strabo, from book 2, chapter 5, section 28 :

This zone corresponds to the current region of Liguria in Italy as well as to the former county of Nice which could be compared today to the Alpes Maritimes.

The writer, naturalist and Roman philosopher Pliny the Elder writes in his book "The Natural History" book III chapter 7 on the Ligurians and Liguria:

	
Just like Strabo, Pliny the Elder situates Liguria between the rivers Varus and Magra. He also quotes the Ligurian peoples living on the other side of the banks of the Var and the Alps. He writes in his book "The Natural History" book III chapter 6 :
	

Transalpine Ligures are said to have inhabited the South Eastern portion of modern France, between the Alps and the Rhone river, from where they constantly battled against the Greek colony of Massalia.

History

Copper and Bronze ages 

Copper begins to be mined from the middle of the 4th millennium BC in Liguria with the Libiola and Monte Loreto mines dated to 3700 BC.. These are the oldest copper mines in the western Mediterranean basin. It was during this period of the Copper Age in Italy that we find throughout Liguria a large number of anthropomorphic stelae in addition to rock engravings.

The Polada Culture (a location near Brescia, Lombardy, Italy) was a cultural horizon extended in the Po valley from eastern Lombardy and Veneto to Emilia and Romagna, formed in the first half of 2nd millennium BC perhaps for the arrival of new people from the transalpine regions of Switzerland and Southern Germany. Its influences are also found in the cultures of the Early Bronze Age of Liguria, Romagna, Corsica, Sardinia (Bonnanaro culture) and Rhone Valley. There are some commonalities with the previous Bell Beaker Culture including the usage of the bow and a certain mastery in metallurgy. Apart from that, the Polada culture does not correspond to the Beaker culture nor to the previous Remedello culture.

The Bronze tools and weapons show similarities with those of the Unetice Culture and other groups in north of Alps. According to Bernard Sergent, the origin of the Ligurian linguistic family (in his opinion distantly related to the Celtic and Italic ones) would have to be found in the Polada culture and Rhone culture, southern branches of the Unetice culture.
	
It is said that the ligurians inhabited the Po valley around the 2,000 B.C., they not only appear in the legends of the Po valley, but would have left traces (linguistic and craft) found in the archaeological also in the area near the northern Adriatic coast. The Ligurians are credited with forming the first villages in the Po Valley of the facies of the pile dwellings and of the dammed settlements, a society that followed the Polada culture, and is well suited in middle and late Bronze Age.

The ancient name of the Po river (Padus in Latin) derived from the Ligurian name of the river: Bod-encus or Bod-incus. This word appears in the placename Bodincomagus, a Ligurian town on the right bank of the Po downstream near today's Turin.

According to a legend, Brescia and Barra (Bergamo) were founded by Cydno, forefather of the Ligurians. This myth seems to have a grain of truth, because recent archaeological excavations have unearthed remains of a settlement dating back to 1200 BC that scholars presume to have been built and inhabited by Ligures. Others scholars attribute the founding of Bergamo and Brescia to the Etruscans.

Canegrate and Golasecca cultures 

The Canegrate culture (13th century BC) may represent the first migratory wave of the proto-Celtic population from the northwest part of the Alps that, through the Alpine passes, penetrated and settled in the western Po valley between Lake Maggiore and Lake Como (Scamozzina culture). They brought a new funerary practice—cremation—which supplanted inhumation. It has also been proposed that a more ancient proto-Celtic presence can be traced back to the beginning of the Middle Bronze Age (16th-15th century BC), when north-western Italy appears closely linked regarding the production of bronze artifacts, including ornaments, to the western groups of the Tumulus culture (Central Europe, 1600 BC - 1200 BC). The bearers of the Canegrate culture maintained its homogeneity for only a century, after which it melded with the Ligurian populations and with this union gave rise to a new phase called the Golasecca culture, which is nowadays identified with the Lepontii and other Celto-Ligurian tribes.

Within the Golasecca culture territory roughly corresponds with the territories occupied by those tribal groups whose names are reported by Latin and Greek historians and geographers:
 Insubri: in the area south of Lake Maggiore, in Varese and part of Novara with Golasecca, Sesto Calende, Castelletto sopra Ticino; from the fifth century BC this area remains suddenly depopulated, while the first settlement of Mediolanum (Milan) rises.
 Leponti: in the Canton of Ticino, with Bellinzona and Sopra Ceneri; in the Ossola.
 Orobi: in the area of Como and Bergamo.
 Laevi and Marici: in Lomellina (Pavia/Ticinum).

Founding of Genoa 

The Genoa area has been inhabited since the fifth or fourth millennium BC. According to excavations carried out in the city between 1898 and 1910, the Ligurian population that lived in Genoa maintained trade relations with the Etruscans and the Greeks, since several objects from these populations were found. In the 5th century BC the first town, or oppidum, was founded at the top of the hill today called Castello (Castle), which is now inside the medieval old town.

Thucydides (5th century BC) speaks of the Ligures having expelled the Sicanians, an Iberian tribe, from the banks of the river Sicanus, in Iberia.

First contacts with Romans 
Ligurian sepulchres of the Italian Riviera and of Provence, holding cremations, exhibit Etruscan and Celtic influences.

In the third century BC, the Romans were in direct contact with the Ligurians. However, Roman expansionism was directed towards the rich territories of Gaul and the Iberian Peninsula (then under Carthaginian control), and the territory of the Ligurians was on the road (they controlled the Ligurian coasts and the south-western Alps).

Despite Roman efforts, only a few Ligurian tribes made alliance agreements with the Romans, notably the Genuates. The rest soon proved hostile. The hostilities were opened in 238 BC by a coalition of Ligurians and Boii Gauls, but the two peoples soon found themselves in disagreement and the military campaign came to a halt with the dissolution of the alliance. Meanwhile, a Roman fleet commanded by Quintus Fabius Maximus routed Ligurian ships on the coast (234-233 BC), allowing the Romans to control the coastal route to and from Gaul.

In 222 BC the Insubres, during a war with Romans occupied the oppidum of Clastidium, that at that time, it was an important locality of the Anamari (or Marici), a Ligurian tribe that, probably for fear of the nearby warlike Insubres, had already accepted the alliance with Rome the year before.

For the first time, the Roman army marched beyond the Po, expanding into Gallia Transpadana. In 222 BC, the battle of Clastidium was fought and allowed Rome to take the capital of the Insubres, Mediolanum (modern-day Milan). To consolidate its dominion, Rome created the colonies of Placentia in the territory of the Boii and Cremona in that of the Insubres.

Second Punic War 
With the outbreak of the second Punic war (218 BC) the Ligurian tribes had different attitudes. Some, like the tribes of the west Riviera and the Apuani, allied with the Carthaginians, providing soldiers to Hannibal's troops when he arrived in Northern Italy, hoping that the Carthaginian general would free them from the neighbouring Romans. Others, like the Genuates, Bagienni and the Taurini, took sides in support of the Romans.

The pro-Carthaginian Ligurians took part in the Battle of the Trebia, which the Carthaginians won. Other Ligurians enlisted in the army of Hasdrubal Barca, when he arrived in Cisalpine Gaul (207 BC), in an attempt to rejoin the troops of his brother Hannibal. In the port of Savo (modern-day Savona), then capital of the Ligures Sabazi, triremes of the Carthaginian fleet of Mago Barca, brother of Hannibal, which were intended to cut the Roman trade routes in the Tyrrhenian Sea, found shelter.

In the early stages of the war, the pro-Roman Ligurians suffered. The Taurini were on the path of Hannibal's march into Italy, and in 218 BC, they were attacked by him, as he had allied with their long-standing enemies, the Insubres. The Taurini chief town of Taurasia (modern-day Turin) was captured by Hannibal's forces after a three-day siege.

In 205 BC, Genua (modern-day Genoa) was attacked and razed to the ground by Mago.

Near the end of the Second Punic War, Mago was among the Ingauni, trying to block the Roman advance. At the Battle of Insubria, he suffered a defeat, and later, died of wounds sustained in the battle. Genua was rebuilt in the same year.

Ligurian troops were present at the Battle of Zama in 202 BC, which marked the final end of Carthage as a great power.

Roman conquest of Ligurians 

In 200 BC, the Ligures and Boii sacked and destroyed the Roman colony of Placentia, effectively controlling the most important ford of the Po Valley.

During the same period, the Romans were at war with the Apuani. Serious Roman efforts began in 182 BC, when both consular armies and a proconsular army were sent against the Ligurians. The wars continued into the 150s BC, when victorious generals celebrated two triumphs over the Ligurians. Here too, the Romans drove many natives off their land and settled colonies in their stead (e.g., Luna and Luca in the 170s BC). During the same period, the Romans were at war with the Ligurian tribes of the northern Apennines.

By the end of the Second Punic War, however, hostilities were not over yet. Ligurian tribes and Carthaginian holdouts operating from the mountain territories continued to fight with guerrilla tactics. Thus, the Romans were forced into continuous military operations in northern Italy.

In 201 BC, the Ingauni signed a peace treaty with Rome.

It was only in 197 BC that the Romans, under the leadership of Minucius Rufus, succeeded in regaining control of the Placentia area by subduing the Celelates, Cerdicates, Ilvati and the Boii Gauls and occupying the oppidum of Clastidium.

Genua was rebuilt by the proconsul Spurius Lucretius in the same year. Having defeated Carthage, Rome sought to expand northwards, and used Genua as a support base for raids, between 191 and 154 BC, against the Ligurian tribes of the hinterland, allied for decades with Carthage.

A second phase of the conflict followed (197-155 BC), characterized by the fact that the Apuani Ligurians entrenched themselves on the Apennines, from where they periodically descended to plunder the surrounding territories. The Romans, for their part, organized continuous expeditions to the mountains, hoping to snide, surround and defeat the Ligurians (taking care not to be destroyed by ambushes). In the course of these wars, the Romans celebrated fifteen triumphs and at suffered at least one serious defeat.

Historically, the beginning of the campaign dates back to 193 BC on the initiative of the Ligurian conciliabula (federations), who organized a major raid going as far as the right bank of the river Arno. Roman campaigns followed (191, 188 and 187 BC); these were victorious, but not decisive.

In the campaign of 186 BC, the Romans were beaten by the Ligurians in the Magra valley. In this battle, which took place in a narrow and precipitous place, the Romans lost about 4000 soldiers, three eagle insignia of the second legion and eleven banners of the Latin allies. In addition, the consul Quintus Martius was also killed in the battle. It is thought that the place of the battle and the death of the consul gave rise to the place-name of Marciaso, or that of the Canal of March on Mount Caprione in the town of Lerici (near the ruins of the city of Luni), which was later founded by the Romans. This mountain had a strategic importance because it controlled the valley of Magra and the sea.

In 185 BC, the Ingauni and the Intimilii also rebelled and managed to resist the Roman legions for the next five years, before capitulating in 180 BC. The Apuani, and those of hinterland side still resisted.

However, the Romans wanted to permanently pacify Liguria to facilitate further conquests in Gaul. To that end, they prepared a large army of almost 36,000 soldiers, under the command of proconsuls Publius Cornelius Cethegus and Marcus Baebius Tamphilus, with the aim of putting an end to Ligurian independence.

In 180 BC, the Romans inflicted a serious defeat on the Apuani Ligures, and deported 40,000 of them to the regions of Samnium. This deportation was followed by another one of 7,000 Ligurians in the following year. These were one of the few cases in which the Romans deported defeated populations in such a high number. In 177 BC other groups of Apuani Ligures surrendered to the Roman forces, and were eventually assimilated into Roman culture during the 2nd century BC, while the military campaign continued further north.

The Frinatiates surrendered in 175 BC, followed by the Statielli (172 BC) and the Velleiates (158 BC). The last Apuani resistance was subdued in 155 BC by consul Marcus Claudius Marcellus.

The subjugation of the coastal Ligures and the annexation of the Alpes Maritimae took place in 14 BC, closely following the occupation of the central Alps in 15 BC.

The last Ligurian tribes (e.g. Vocontii and Salluvii) still autonomous, who occupied Provence, were subdued in 124 BC.

Under Roman rule 

Cisalpine Gaul was the part of modern Italy inhabited by Celts during the 4th and 3rd centuries BC. Conquered by the Roman Republic in the 220s BC, it was a Roman province from c. 81 BC until 42 BC, when it was merged into Roman Italy as indicated in Caesar's will (Acta Caesaris). In 49 BC all inhabitants of northern Italy received Roman citizenship.

Around 7 BC, Augustus divided Italy into eleven regiones, as reported by Pliny the Elder in his Naturalis Historia. One of these was Regio IX: Liguria. Genoa became the centre of this region and the Ligurian populations moved towards the definitive Romanization.

The official historical name did not have the Liguria apposition, due to the contemporary academic use of naming the Augustan regions according to the populations they understood. Regio IX included only the Ligurian territory. This territory extended from the Maritime and Cottian Alps and the Var river (to the west) to the Trebbia and the Magra bordering Regio VIII Aemilia and Regio VII Etruria (to the east), and the Po to the north.

Pliny describes the region thus: "patet ora Liguriae inter amnes Varum et Macram XXXI Milia passuum. Haec regio ex descriptione Augusti nona est". 

People with Ligurian names were living south of Placentia, in Italy, as late as 102 AD.

In 126 AD the Liguria region was the birthplace of Pertinax, Roman soldier and politician who became Roman Emperor.

Theories on the origin of the Ligurians 

In the 19th century, the origins of the Ligures drew renewed attention from scholars. Amédée Thierry, a French historian and journalist, linked them to the Iberians. The historian of the Bourgogne and specialist in its Gallic culture, Dominique-François-Louis Roget, Baron de Belloguet, would later claim a Gallic origin of the Ligurians. During the Iron Age the spoken language, the main divinities and the workmanship of the artifacts unearthed in the area of Liguria (such as the numerous torcs found) were similar to those of Celtic culture in both style and type.

Karl Müllenhoff, professor of Germanic antiquities at the Universities of Kiel and Berlin, studying the sources of the Ora maritima by Avienius (a Latin poet who lived in the 4th century AD, but who used as a source for his own work a Phoenician Periplum of the 6th century BC), held that the name 'Ligurians' generically referred to various peoples who lived in western Europe, including the Celts, but thought the "real Ligurians" were a Pre-Indo-European population. Italian geologist and paleontologist Arturo Issel considered Ligurians to be direct descendants of the Cro-Magnon people that lived throughout Gaul from the Mesolithic period.

Those in favor of an Indo-European origin included Henri d'Arbois de Jubainville, a 19th-century French historian, who argued in Les Premiers habitants de l'Europe (1877) that the Ligurians were the earliest Indo-European speakers of western Europe. Jubainville's "Celto-Ligurian hypothesis", as it later became known, was significantly expanded in the second edition of his initial study. It inspired a body of contemporary philological research, as well as some archaeological work. The Celto-Ligurian hypothesis became associated with the Funnelbeaker culture and "expanded to cover much of Central Europe".

Julius Pokorny adapted the Celto-Ligurian hypothesis into one linking the Ligures to the Illyrians, citing an array of similar evidence from Eastern Europe. Under this theory the "Ligures-Illyrians" became associated with the prehistoric Urnfield peoples.

Today some accounts suggest that the Ligures represented the northern branch of an ethno-linguistic layer older than and very different from the proto-Italic peoples. It was believed that a "Ligurian-Sicanian" culture occupied a wide area of southern Europe, stretching from Liguria to Sicily and Iberia. However, while any such area would be broadly similar to that of the paleo-European "Tyrrhenian culture" hypothesized by later modern scholars, there are no known links between the Tyrrenians and Ligurians.

There are others such as Dominique Garcia, who question whether the Ligures can be considered a distinct ethnic group or culture from the surrounding cultures.

Culture

Society 

The Ligurians never formed a centralized state, they were in fact divided into independent tribes, in turn organized in small villages or castles. Rare were the oppidas, to which corresponded the federal capitals of the individual tribes or important commercial emporiums.

The territory of a tribe was almost entirely public property, only a small percentage of the land (the cultivated) was "private", in the sense that, against payment of a small tax, was given in concession. Only late in life did the concept of private, heritable or marketable property develop.

Within the tribes, an egalitarian and communal spirit prevailed. If there was also a noble class, this was tempered by "tribal rallies" in which all the classes participated; there does not seem to have been any pre-organized magistracy. There were no dynastic leaders either: the Ligurian "king" was elected as leader of a tribe or a federation of tribes; only in late period did a real dynastic aristocratic class begin to emerge. Originally there was no slavery: prisoners of war were massacred or sacrificed.

Diodorus Siculus, in the first century B.C., writes that women take part in the work of toil alongside men.

Religion 
Among the most important testimonies, the sacred mountain sites (Mont Bègo, Monte Beigua) and the development of megalithicism (statues-stelae of Lunigiana) are worth mentioning.

The spectacular Mont Bégo in Vallée des merveilles is the most representative site of the numerous sacred sites covered with rock carvings, and in particular with cupels, gullies and ritual basins. The latter would indicate that a fundamental part of the rites of the ancient Ligurians, provided for the use of water (or milk, blood?). The site of  Mont Bégo has an extension and spectacularity comparable to the sites of Val Camonica. Another important sacred centre is Mount Beigua, but the reality is that many promontories in North-west Italy and the Alps present these types of sacred centres.

Among the more considerable Ligurian monuments are rock engravings and anthropomorphic sculptures analogous to those of southern France, found in Lunigiana and Corsica. Some of these artistic manifestations are repeated in territories farther east

The other important evidence is the proliferation of megaliths, the most spectacular and original of which is that of the stele statues in the Lunigiana. These particular oblong stones, stuck in the ground of the woods, ended with stylized human heads, and could be equipped with arms, sexual attributes and significant objects (e.g. daggers). Their real meaning has been lost in memory, today it is assumed that they represented:
 gods;
 ancestors and divinized heroes;
 the birth from the womb to symbolize the origin of their race originated directly from the womb of the earth and nature.

The heads, so represented, for the Ligurians were the seat of the soul, the center of emotions and the point of the body where all the senses were concentrated, consequently the essence of the divine and hence its cult.

In general, it is believed that the Ligurian religion was rather primitive, addressed to supernatural tutelary gods, representing the great forces of nature, and from which you could get help and protection through their divination.

The proliferation of sacred centers near the peaks, would indicate the cult of majestic celestial numes, represented by the high peaks: in fact Beg- (from which Baginus and Baginatie), Penn- (later transformed by Romanization in Iuppiter Poeninus and in the Apenninus pater) and Alb- (from which Albiorix) are indicated as tutelary numes of the Ligurian peaks.

Among the many engravings, significant is the presence of the figure of the bull, even if only stylized through the symbol of the horns, this would indicate the cult of a deity taurine, male and fertilizer, already known to Anatolian and Semitic cultures.

Another important deity was Cycnus of Liguria, which perhaps represents the divinization of a mythical ancient king or, the totemic animal associated with the cult of the sun.

Dress 
Diodorus Siculus reports the use of a tunic tightened at the waist by a leather belt and closed by a clasp generally bronze; the legs were bare. Other garments used were cloaks "sagum", and during the winter animal skins to shelter from the cold.

Lucan in his Pharsalia (c. 61 AD) described Ligurian tribes as being long-haired, and their hair a shade of auburn (a reddish-brown):

Warfare 

Diodorus Siculus describes the Ligurians as very fearsome enemies.

Tactics, unit types and equipment 
The armament varied according to the class and the comfort of the owner, in general however the great mass of the Ligurian warriors was substantially light infantry, armed in a poor way. The main weapon was the spear, with cusps that could exceed a cubit (about 45 cm, or one and half foot ), followed by the sword, of Gallic shape (sometimes cheap because made with soft metals), very rarely the warriors were equipped with bows and arrows.

The protection was entrusted to an oblong shield of wood, always of Celtic typology (but to difference of this last one without metallic boss) and a simple helmet, of Montefortino type.

The horned helmets, recovered in the Apuani tribe area, were probably used only for ceremonial purpose and they were worn by warchief, to underline their virility and military skills. The use of armor is not known: the seated warrior from the site of Roquepertuse seems to wear leather armor, although the statue is attributable to the 5th century A.D. and the armor maybe was used only in this period. Even if it is possible that the richer warriors used armor in organic material like the Gauls or the Greek linothorax.

Cavalry 
Strabo and Diodorus Siculus say they fought mostly on foot, because of the nature of their territory, but their phrasing implies that cavalry was not entirely unknown, and two recently discovered Ligurian graves have included harness fittings. Strabo says that the Salyes, a tribe located north of Massalia, had a substantial cavalry force, but they were one of the several Celto-Ligurian tribes, and the cavalry probably reflected a Celtic element.

The Ligures seem to have been ready to engage as mercenary troops in the service of others. Ligurian auxiliaries are mentioned in the army of the Carthaginian general Hamilcar I in 480 BC. Greek leaders in Sicily continued to recruit Ligurian mercenary forces as late as the time of Agathocles.

The Ingauni, a tribe of sailors located around Albingaunum (nowadays Albenga) were famous to engage trade and piracy, hostiles to Rome, they were subdued by consul Lucius Emilius Paullus Macedonicus in 181 BC.

Under Roman service 
According to Plutarch, Ligurian auxiliaries fought for the Romans in the Battle of Pydna, the decisive battle of Third Macedonian War.

Sallustius and Plutarch say that during the Jugurthine War (from 112 to 105 BC) and the Cimbrian War (from 104 to 101 BC) the Ligurians served as auxiliary troops in the Roman army. In the course of this last conflict they played an important role in the Battle of Aquae Sextae.

Economy 
The Ligurian economy was based on primitive agriculture, sheep farming, hunting and the exploitation of forests. Diodorus Siculus writes about the Ligurians:

Since their country is mountainous and full of trees, some of them use all day to cut wood, using strong and heavy dark; others, who want to cultivate the land, must deal with breaking stones, because it is so dry soil that you can not pick tools remove a sod, that with it do not rise stones. However, even if they have to fight with so many misfortunes, by means of stubborn work they go beyond nature [...] they often give themselves to hunting, and finding quantities of savage, with it they make up for the lack of bladders; and so it comes, that flowing through their snow-covered mountains, and getting used to practicing then more difficult places of the thickets, they harden their bodies, and strengthen their muscles admirably. Some of them, due to the famine of food, drink water, and live of meat of domestic and wild animals.

Thanks to the contact with the bronze "metal seekers", the Ligurians also dedicated themselves to mining.

The commercial activity is important. Already in ancient times the Ligurians were known in the Mediterranean for the trade of the precious Baltic amber. With the development of the Celtic populations, the Ligurians found themselves controlling a crucial access to the sea, becoming (sometimes in spite of themselves) custodians of an important way of communication.

Although they were not renowned navigators, they came to have a small maritime fleet, and their attitude to navigation is described as follows:

They sail for reason of shops on the sea of Sardinia and Libya, spontaneously exposing themselves to extreme dangers; they use smaller hulls than vulgar boats for this; nor are they practical of the comfort of other ships; and what is surprising is that they are not afraid to sustain the serious risks of storms.

Tribes

References

Bibliography
 ARSLAN E. A. 2004b, LVI.14 Garlasco, in I Liguri. Un antico popolo europeo tra Alpi e Mediterraneo, Catalogo della Mostra (Genova, 23.10.2004-23.1.2005), Milano-Ginevra, pp. 429–431.
 ARSLAN E. A. 2004 c.s., Liguri e Galli in Lomellina, in I Liguri. Un antico popolo europeo tra Alpi e Mediterraneo, Saggi Mostra (Genova, 23.10.2004–23.1.2005).
 Raffaele De Marinis, Giuseppina Spadea (a cura di), Ancora sui Liguri. Un antico popolo europeo tra Alpi e Mediterraneo, De Ferrari editore, Genova 2007 (scheda sul volume).
 John Patterson, Sanniti,Liguri e Romani,Comune di Circello;Benevento
 Giuseppina Spadea (a cura di), I Liguri. Un antico popolo europeo tra Alpi e Mediterraneo (catalogo mostra, Genova 2004–2005), Skira editore, Genova 2004

Further reading

 Berthelot, André. "LES LIGURES." Revue Archéologique 2 (1933): 245-303. www.jstor.org/stable/41750896.

 
Indo-European peoples
History of Italy
Ancient history of France
History of Provence-Alpes-Côte d'Azur
History of Piedmont
History of Europe
History of Liguria
History of Lombardy
Historical Celtic peoples
Transhumant ethnic groups
Ancient peoples of Italy
Ancient peoples of France
Ancient peoples of Spain
Ancient peoples of Sardinia
Ancient peoples of Europe